The Captain of the Guard is a position for a military force. It is also a position for jail and prison terms.

Military use
A Captain of the Guard is the commanding position of a military security force. The position of Captain of the Guard is no longer associated with the rank of Captain. The Guard is commonly associated with bodyguard duty for royalty or head of state, but the Guard can refer to the military security force of a city or region such as a province, state, or territory.

Jail and prison use
A captain of the guard is the leading guard for correctional institutes, such as jails and prisons, in some jurisdictions.

Military ranks